Temple of Knowledge (Kataklysm Part III) is the second full-length by Kataklysm released in 1996 by Nuclear Blast. It was re-issued in 2003 as a digipak and included their demo The Vortex of Resurrection.

Track listing

Personnel
Kataklysm
 Sylvain Houde – vocals
 Jean-François Dagenais – guitar
 Maurizio Iacono – bass, backing vocals
 Nick Miller – drums

Production
 Glen Robinson - engineering
 Jocelyn Daoust - engineering
 Jean-François Dagenais - producer, mixing engineer
 Don Hackey - engineering assist.

Kataklysm albums
1996 albums